The Megalithic Walls of Altamura are defensive walls dating back to the 4th century BCE. They were the city walls of the ancient city of Altamura, Italy. Nowadays, only a few parts of the original wall remain; the original track of the wall spanned over a length of about 3.6 km. They were about 4 meters high, while the base of the walls was about 5 meters wide.

The megalithic walls are often confused with the city walls of today's Altamura historic center, of which fragments remain today in some parts as well. The two walls refer to different time periods and to different parts of the city: the megalithic walls refer to the ancient city, which was later abandoned or sacked, while the walls of Altamura historic center refer to the period starting from the founding of Altamura by king Frederick II of Hohenstaufen (13th century AD).

Cesare Orlandi 
Cesare Orlandi, in his work Delle città d'Italia (1770), mentioned the wall and suggested that the name of the city of Altamura might be due to its megalithic walls. He also mentioned a large number of archaeological findings of that period, which occurred very close the megalithic walls and that now have been lost.

Rocca maps 
Inside Rocca map P/33, commissioned by Angelo Rocca and stored inside Angelica Library, Rome, some memorial stones can be seen on the megalithic walls. At the end of the 16th century, those memorial stones were still present, before being destroyed at a certain point.

Gallery

See also 
 Altamura Man
 Epitaph of Altamura
 City Walls of Altamura
 Altamura Cathedral

References

Bibliography

External links 
 HistAntArtSi - Altamuira, Mura megalitiche
 Mura Megalitiche, il ricordo possente della storia - Altamuralive
 Le mura megalistiche - Panealtamura.it
 Mura megalitiche - Stereofot.it

Monuments and memorials in Italy
Altamura